Comrade means friend, colleague, or ally.

Comrade or Comrades may also refer to:

Arts, literature and entertainment
 Comrade (2012 film), also called Into the White
 Comrade (2017 film), a Bengali drama film

 Comrades (TV series), a 1983-84 BBC television documentary series
 Comrades (1919 film), a 1919 German silent film
 Comrades (1921 film), a 1921 German silent film
 Comrades (1928 film), a 1928 American silent film
 Comrades (1986 film), a 1986 British historical drama film
 Comrades (The Americans), the first episode of the second season of the television series The Americans
 Comrades: Almost a Love Story, a 1996 Hong Kong film
 Comrades (band), an American rock band

Organizations
 Western Springs AFC, formally Comrades FC
 Comrades Association, a communist organization that was operative in the State of Hyderabad in India
 Comrades Party, a left-wing Iranian political party active during the 1940s

Other
 Comrade (horse) (1917–1928), British Thoroughbred racehorse
The Comrade, former weekly English-language newspaper, India

See also
 Comrades Marathon, an ultramarathon in South Africa